The 2016–17 Xavier Musketeers women's basketball team represented Xavier University during the 2016–17 NCAA Division I women's basketball season. The Musketeers, led by sixth-year head coach Brian Neal, played their games at the Cintas Center and were fourth year members of the newly reorganized Big East Conference. They finished the season 12–18, 4–14 in Big East play to finish in a tie for seventh place. They lost in the first round of the Big East women's tournament to Butler.

Roster

Schedule

|-
!colspan=9 style="background:#062252; color:#FFFFFF;"| Non-conference regular season

|-
!colspan=9 style="background:#062252; color:#FFFFFF;"| Big East regular season

|-
!colspan=9 style="background:#062252; color:#FFFFFF;"| Big East Women's Tournament

See also
 2016–17 Xavier Musketeers men's basketball team

References

Xavier
Xavier Musketeers women's basketball seasons